Monedderlust FC is a Guyanese football club based in Berbice, competing in the GFF Elite League, the top tier of Guyanese football. They competed in the inaugural season of the Elite League in 2015.

Honours
 Berbice regional champions
 Winners (2): 2006, 2007

References

Football clubs in Guyana